, also known by pen name Ryu Moto, is a Japanese manga artist from Fukuoka Prefecture. He is best known for his work on Petit Eva: Evangelion@School.

Works
 Ultimate Girls (Dengeki Bunko, ASCII Media Works)
 Ultimate Girls (Dengeki Comic Gao!, ASCII Media Works)
  (Manga Time Kirara Max, Houbunsha)
  (Magi-Cu, Enterbrain)
 White Chaos (Comic Seed!, Penguin Shobō)
  (Magi-Cu, Enterbrain)
 Petit Eva: Evangelion@School (Shōnen Ace, Kadokawa Shoten)
  (Quarterly Gelatin, Wanimagazine)
  (Web Comic Gekkin, Bandai Visual)
  (Comic Rex, Ichijinsha)
  (Famitsu, Enterbrain)
  (Manga Club Original, Takeshobo)
  (Comic Earth Star, Earth Star Entertainment)

References

External links

1981 births
Living people
Manga artists from Fukuoka Prefecture